Kill the Thrill is a French rock band, formed in 1989 in Marseille. The band consists of Nicolas Dick (lead vocals, guitar, programming), Marylin Tognolli (bass, programming, vocals), and Frédéric De Benedetti (guitar, vocals).

Generally associated with the industrial music movement, the band has dabbled with a variety of sounds during its career, ranging from alternative rock, to ambient goth, to darker new wave, and heavy metal. The band's musical eclecticism led to a cult following among its selective audience. The band has cited Killing Joke, Godflesh, Swans and The Young Gods as influences. During its career, Kill the Thrill has also released records sporadically, including Dig (1993), Low (1996), 203 Barriers (2003), and Tellurique (2005). Their third album, 203 Barriers, featured contributions from Michael Gira of Swans.

Kill the Thrill also performed as a supporting act for bands such as Killing Joke, The Young Gods, Einstürzende Neubauten and Treponem Pal.

Members
Current members
 Nicolas Dick – lead vocals, guitar, programming
 Marylin Tognolli – bass, programming, vocals
 Frédéric De Benedetti – guitar, vocals

Past members
 Thierry Ringelstein - guitar
 Patrick Allard – guitar
ERikm – guitar 
 Leon – guitar

Discography

Studio albums
 Dig (1993)
 Low (1996)
 203 Barriers (2003)
 Tellurique (2005)

EPs
 Pit (1993)

Splits
 Les Enfants du Mistral (1990, E.P.) Taktik Mag
 Untitled (1997, with Münch)
 "Büccolision" (2008, with Overmars)

 Covers 
 2005 : Us and them (Godflesh) Tellurique CD
 2008 : A strange day (The Cure) "Feardrop" released

Demos
 1989'' (2015)

References

External links
 

Musical groups established in 1989
Alternative metal musical groups
Industrial rock musical groups
French industrial metal musical groups
French musical trios
Musical groups from Marseille
Season of Mist artists